Verica Kalanović (born 1954) is a Serbian politician. She served as the Minister of Regional Development and Local Self-Government from 2012 to 2013, and as the Minister of National Investment Plan from 2008 to 2012. She also served as the Deputy Prime Minister of Serbia from 2011 to 2012.

Education and career
Kalanović was born in Trstenik, SR Serbia, Yugoslavia and graduated in 1977 from the Faculty of Technology and Metallurgy in Belgrade, where she also received a master's degree in 1980.
From 1980 to 1993, she worked in Prva Petoletka in Trstenik. From 1993 to 2003, she was professor at the post-secondary technical school in Trstenik. From 2000 to 2001, she was member of the Trstenik municipality executive council.

From 2003 to 2006, she was head of G17 Plus caucus in the parliament of Serbia and Montenegro. She was president of the Serbia-Montenegrin Parliament's Committee for interior economic relations and finances, a member of the parliamentary delegation in the Council of Europe and a member of the committee for local and regional development in the Council of Europe.

She was State Secretary in the Ministry of Economy and Regional Development from 2007 to July 2008.

On 7 July 2008 she was elected Minister for National Investment Plan., and resigned to the post following announcement of Cabinet re-shuffle which took place on 2 September 2013.

Personal life
Kalanović is married with two children.

References

External links

1954 births
Living people
People from Trstenik, Serbia
G17 Plus politicians
Government ministers of Serbia
Women government ministers of Serbia
21st-century Serbian women politicians
21st-century Serbian politicians